Carroll Township is an inactive township in Reynolds County, in the U.S. state of Missouri.

Carroll Township was erected in 1845.

References

Townships in Missouri
Townships in Reynolds County, Missouri